Nam Ji-hyun (born September 17, 1995) is a South Korean actress who successfully transitioned from being one of the industry's premiere child artists to an acclaimed lead, well-loved for her roles in Queen Seondeok, Suspicious Partner, 100 Days My Prince, and 365: Repeat the Year.

Early life and education 
Nam enrolled in Sogang University as a Psychology major in 2014, and finished her degree in February 2020, while she remained as an active actress in between her studies.

Career

2004–2015: Beginnings as a child actress
Nam began her career as a child actress, and is best known for her roles in East of Eden (2008), Queen Seondeok (2009), Will It Snow for Christmas? (2009), Angel Eyes (2014), and What Happens to My Family? (2014). She also appeared in the miniseries Girl Detective, Park Hae-sol, teen drama To the Beautiful You, and the films A Reason to Live and Hwayi: A Monster Boy.

2016–present: Rising popularity and leading roles
In 2016, she headlined her first drama, MBC's romantic-comedy Shopaholic Louis with Seo In-guk, where she impressed viewers with her acting. 

In 2017, she starred in SBS's legal drama Suspicious Partner alongside Ji Chang-wook. The show enjoyed modest viewership share, but it beat its competitor by topping the important 20-49 year old demographic, as well as streaming, popularity, and brand reputation charts for consecutive weeks.

In 2018, Nam starred alongside Exo's D.O in the historical romance drama 100 Days My Prince. The series was a commercial success, becoming the twelfth highest-rated Korean drama in cable television history.

In 2020, Nam starred in the fantasy mystery thriller 365: Repeat the Year as a perfectionist webtoon writer.

In October 2022, it was announced that Nam would be holding a Welcome to my house!' fan meeting on November 26.On October 31, the agency announced that it had postponed the fan meeting ticket booking schedule, The original date was November 1st, postponed to November 8th due to the Seoul Halloween crowd crush.

Filmography

Film

Television series

Web series

Music videos

Awards and nominations

References

External links

 Nam Ji-hyun at Management Soop
 
 
 
 

21st-century South Korean actresses
South Korean television actresses
South Korean film actresses
South Korean child actresses
South Korean web series actresses
1995 births
Living people
Sogang University alumni
People from Incheon